Boulder is a home rule city that is the county seat and most populous municipality of Boulder County, Colorado, United States. The city population was 108,250 at the 2020 United States census, making it the 12th most populous city in Colorado. Boulder is the principal city of the Boulder, CO Metropolitan Statistical Area and an important part of the Front Range Urban Corridor.

It is home of the main campus of the University of Colorado, the state's largest university.

History

On November 7, 1861, the Colorado General Assembly passed legislation to locate the University of Colorado in Boulder. On September 20, 1875, the first cornerstone was laid for the first building (Old Main) on the CU campus. The university officially opened on September 5, 1877.

In 1907, Boulder adopted an anti-saloon ordinance. Statewide prohibition started in Colorado in 1916 and ended with the repeal of national prohibition in 1933.

Geography

The city of Boulder is located in the Boulder Valley, where the Rocky Mountains meet the Great Plains. The Flatirons, slabs of sedimentary stone tilted up on the foothills, are located west of the city. The Flatirons are a widely recognized symbol of Boulder.

Boulder Creek is the primary flow of water through Boulder. The creek was named prior to the city's founding, for all of the large granite boulders that have cascaded into the creek over the eons. It is from Boulder Creek that Boulder city is believed to have taken its name. Boulder Creek has significant water flow, derived primarily from snow melt and minor springs west of the city. The creek is a tributary of the South Platte River.

At the 2020 United States Census, the city had a total area of  including  of water.

The 40th parallel (40 degrees north latitude) runs through Boulder and can be easily recognized as Baseline Road today.

Arapahoe Glacier provides water for the city, along with Boulder Creek, which flows through the center of the city.

Growth management

Since then, Boulder has adopted a policy of controlled urban expansion. In 1959, city voters approved the "Blue Line" city-charter amendment which restricted city water service to altitudes below , in an effort to protect the mountain backdrop from development. In 1967, city voters approved a dedicated sales tax for the acquisition of open space in an effort to contain urban sprawl. In 1970, Boulder created a "comprehensive plan" that would dictate future zoning, transportation, and urban planning decisions. Hoping to preserve residents' views of the mountains, in 1972, the city enacted an ordinance limiting the height of newly constructed buildings. A Historic-Preservation Code was passed in 1974, and a residential-growth management ordinance (the Danish Plan) in 1976.

Effective growth management has resulted in a rapid increase in housing costs with the median home price rising 60% over the period 2010 to 2015 to $648,200.

Wildlife protection
Boulder has created an Urban Wildlife Management Plan which sets policies for managing and protecting urban wildlife. Also, the city's Parks and Recreation and Open Space and Mountain Parks departments have volunteers who monitor parks (including wetlands, lakes, etc.) to protect ecosystems. From time to time, parks and hiking trails are closed to conserve or restore ecosystems.
Traditionally, Boulder has avoided the use of chemical pesticides for controlling the insect population. However, with the threat of West Nile virus, the city began an integrative plan to control the mosquito population in 2003 that includes chemical pesticides. Residents can opt-out of the program by contacting the city and asking that their areas not be sprayed.

Under Boulder law, extermination of prairie dogs requires a permit.

Also in 2005, the city experimented with using goats for weed control in environmentally sensitive areas. Goats naturally consume diffuse knapweed and Canada thistle, and although the program was not as effective as it was hoped, goats will still be considered in the future weed control projects. In 2010, goats were used to keep weeds under control at the Boulder Reservoir.

The city's Open Space and Mountain Parks department manages approximately 8,000 acres of protected forest land west of the city in accordance with a 1999 Forest Ecosystem Management Plan. The plan aims to maintain or enhance native plant and animal species, their communities, and the ecological processes that sustain them and to reduce the wildfire risk to forest and human communities.

Climate

Boulder has a temperate climate typical for much of the state and receives many sunny or mostly sunny days each year. Under the Köppen climate classification, the city is considered semi-arid (Köppen BSk) or humid subtropical (Köppen Cfa) as it falls near that precipitation boundary, due to its relatively high yearly precipitation and average temperatures remaining above  year-round. Winter conditions range from generally mild to the occasional bitterly cold, with highs averaging in the mid to upper 40s °F (7–9 °C). There are 4.6 nights annually during which the temperature reaches . Because of orographic lift, the mountains to the west often dry out the air passing over the Front Range, often shielding the city from precipitation in winter, though heavy snowfalls may occur. Summers are warm, with frequent afternoon thunderstorms. Roughly 30 days reach  or above each year. Diurnal temperature variation is typically large due to the high elevation and semi-arid climate. Daytime highs are generally cooler than those of most Colorado cities with similar elevations. However, Boulder's nighttime lows are mild, particularly during winter.
The highest recorded temperature of  occurred most recently on June 25, 2012. The coldest high temperature, was recorded on February 4, 1989, while the warmest overnight low was recorded on July 20, 1998, with a temperature of

Demographics

Boulder is the principal city of the Boulder, CO Metropolitan Statistical Area.

As of the 2010 census, there were 97,385 people, 41,302 households, and 16,694 families residing in the city. The population density was 3,942.7 inhabitants per square mile (1,524.0/km). The racial makeup of the city was 88.0% White, 0.9% Black or African American, 0.4% Native American, 4.7% Asian, 0.1% Pacific Islander, 3.2% some other race, and 2.6% from two or more races. 8.7% of the population are Hispanic or Latino of any race.

There were 41,302 households, out of which 19.1% had children under the age of 18 living with them, 32.2% were headed by married couples living together, 5.5% had a female householder with no husband present, and 59.6% were non-families. 35.8% of all households were made up of individuals, and 7.1% were someone living alone who was 65 years of age or older. The average household size was 2.16, and the average family size was 2.84.

Boulder's population is younger than the national average, largely due to the presence of university students. The median age at the 2010 census was 28.7 years compared to the U.S. median of 37.2 years. In Boulder, 13.9% of the residents were younger than the age of 18, 29.1% from 18 to 24, 27.6% from 25 to 44, 20.3% from 45 to 64, and 8.9% were 65 years of age or older. For every 100 females, there were 105.5 males. For every 100 females age 18 and older, there were 106.2 males.

In 2011 the estimated median household income in Boulder was $57,112, and the median family income was $113,681. Male full-time workers had a median income of $71,993 versus $47,574 for females. The per capita income for the city was $37,600. 24.8% of the population and 7.6% of families were below the poverty line. Out of the total population, 17.4% of those under the age of 18 and 6.0% of those 65 and older were living below the poverty line.

Economy

The Boulder MSA had a gross metropolitan product of $18.3 billion in 2010, the 110th largest metropolitan economy in the United States.

In 2007, Boulder became the first city in the United States to levy a carbon tax.

In 2013, Boulder appeared on Forbes magazine's list of Best Places for Business and Careers.

Top employers
According to the city's 2020 Comprehensive Annual Financial Report, the top employers are:

Arts and culture

Bolder Boulder
Boulder has hosted a 10 km road run, the Bolder Boulder, on Memorial Day, every year since 1979. The race involves over 50,000 runners, joggers, walkers, and wheelchair racers, making it one of the largest road races in the world. It has the largest non-marathon prize purse in road racing. The race culminates at Folsom Field with a Memorial Day Tribute. The 2007 race featured over 54,000 runners, walkers, and wheelchair racers, making it the largest race in the US in which all participants are timed and the fifth largest road race in the world.

Music
Founded in 1958, the Boulder Philharmonic Orchestra is a professional orchestra under the leadership of its Music Director Michael Butterman.

Founded in 1976 by Giora Bernstein, the Colorado Music Festival presents a summer series of concerts in Chautauqua Auditorium.

Founded in 1981, the Boulder Bach Festival (BBF) is an annual festival celebrating the life, legacy, and music of J.S. Bach. The festival is led by Executive Director Zachary Carrettin and Artistic Director Mina Gajic.

Dance 
Boulder is home to multiple dance companies and establishments. Boulder Ballet was founded by former American Ballet Theatre dancer Larry Boyette in the 1970s as part of the Ballet Arts Studios. Lemon Sponge Cake Contemporary Ballet was founded in 2004 by Robert Sher-Machherndl, former principal dancer of the Dutch National Ballet and Bavarian State Ballet.

Conference on World Affairs
The Conference on World Affairs, started in 1948, is an annual one-week conference featuring dozens of discussion panels on a variety of contemporary issues.

eTown
The internationally syndicated radio program eTown has its headquarters at eTown Hall, at the intersection of 16th and Spruce Streets, in downtown Boulder. Most tapings of this weekly show are done at eTown Hall.

Polar Bear Plunge
Beginning in 1983, hundreds of people head to the Boulder Reservoir on New Year's Day to take part in the annual polar bear plunge. With rescue teams standing by, participants use a variety of techniques to plunge themselves into the freezing reservoir. Once the plunge is complete, swimmers retreat to hot tubs on the reservoir beach to revive themselves from the cold.

Naked Pumpkin Run
Starting in 1998, dozens of people have taken part in a Halloween run down the city's streets wearing only shoes and a hollowed-out pumpkin on their heads. In 2009, local police threatened participants with charges of indecent exposure and no naked runners were reported in official newscasts, although a few naked runners were observed by locals. Several illegal attempts, resulting in arrests, have been made to restart the run, but no serious effort has been mounted.

420
For several years on April 20, thousands of people gathered on the CU Boulder campus to celebrate 420 and smoke marijuana at and before 4:20 pm. The 2010 head count was officially between 8,000 and 15,000 with some discrepancy between the local papers and the university administrators (who have been thought to have been attempting to downplay the event). Eleven citations were given out whereas the year before there were only two. 2011 was the last year of mass 420 partying at CU as the university, in 2012, took a hard stance against 420 activities, closing the campus to visitors for the day, using smelly fish fertilizer to discourage gathering at the Norlin Quad, and having out-of-town law enforcement agencies help secure the campus. In 2013, April 20 fell on a Saturday; the university continued the 420 party ban and, again, closed the campus to visitors. In 2015 the government conceded and once again opened the park to visitors on April 20.

Boulder Cruiser Ride

The Happy Thursday Cruiser Ride is a weekly bicycle ride in Boulder Colorado. The Boulder Cruiser Ride grew from a group of friends and friends of friends in the early 90's riding bicycles around Boulder into the social cycling event it is today. Some enthusiasts gather wearing costumes and decorating their bikes; themes are an integral part of the cruiser tradition. Boulder Police began following the cruiser ride as it gained in popularity in the early 2000's. Issues with underage drinking, reckless bicycle riding, and other nuisance complaints led organizers to drop the cruiser ride as a public event. Returning to an underground format, where enthusiasts must become part of the social network before gaining access to event sites, the Boulder Cruiser Ride has continued as a local tradition. On May 30, 2013, over 400 riders attended the Thursday-night Cruiser Ride in honor of "Big Boy", an elk that was shot and killed on New Year's Day by an on-duty Boulder Police officer.

Parks and recreation

Boulder is surrounded by thousands of acres of recreational open space, conservation easements, and nature preserves. Almost 60%, of open space totaling  is open to the public.

The unincorporated community of Eldorado Springs, south of Boulder, is home to rock climbing routes. There are also climbing routes available in the city open space, including climbing routes of varying difficulty on the Flatirons themselves (traditional protection). Boulder Canyon (sport), directly west of downtown Boulder, also has many routes. All three of these areas are affected by seasonal closures for wildlife.

Government
Boulder is a home rule municipality, being self-governing under Article XX of the Constitution of the State of Colorado; Title 31, Article 1, Section 202 of the Colorado Revised Statutes.

Politically, Boulder is one of the most liberal and Democratic cities in Colorado when viewed from a Federal and State elections lens. , registered voters in Boulder County were 43.4% Democratic, 14.7% Republican, 1.6% in other parties, and 40.3% unaffiliated. By residents and detractors alike, Boulder is often referred to as the "People's Republic of Boulder".

In 1974, the Boulder City Council passed Colorado's first ordinance prohibiting discrimination based on sexual orientation. Boulder voters, however, repealed the measure by referendum within a year. In 1975, Boulder County Clerk Clela Rorex was the second in the United States ever to grant same-sex marriage licenses, prior to state laws being passed to prevent such issuance.

In July 2019, Boulder declared a "climate emergency" and established target dates for achieving 100% renewable electricity, a reduction in greenhouse gas emissions from city organizations and facilities, an increase in local generation of electricity through renewable sources, and a reduction in greenhouse gas emissions from the community The city also created a community-centered process to focus on energy systems, regenerative ecosystems, circular materials economy, land use, and financial systems.

Education

Public schools
The Boulder Valley School District (BVSD) administers the public school system in Boulder, aside from a few areas in northeast Boulder where students attend the St. Vrain Valley School District.

Charter schools
Charter schools within the city of Boulder include Preparatory High School (9–12), Summit Middle School (6–8), and Horizons Alternative School (K–8).

Private schools
A variety of private high schools, middle schools and elementary schools operate in Boulder.

Colleges and universities

 University of Colorado Boulder, public university which contributes roughly 46,000 residents (30,000 undergraduate students, 7,000 graduate students and 10,000 staff/faculty) to the population.
 Naropa University is a private university based on Buddhist principles. It has approximately 400 undergraduate and over 600 graduate students.
 Auguste Escoffier School of Culinary Arts a culinary school group with campuses in Boulder and Austin, Texas.

Science institutes
 Cooperative Institute for Research in Environmental Sciences (CIRES)
 Cooperative Institute for Research in the Atmosphere (CIRA)
 Center for Astrophysics and Space Astronomy (CASA)
 Colorado Center for Astrodynamics Research (CCAR)
 Institute of Arctic and Alpine Research (INSTAAR)
 JILA (Formerly Joint Institute for Laboratory Astrophysics)
 Laboratory for Atmospheric and Space Physics (LASP)
 Geological Society of America, headquartered at 3300 Penrose Place.
 National Ecological Observatory Network (NEON)
 National Center for Atmospheric Research (NCAR) / University Corporation for Atmospheric Research (UCAR)
 High Altitude Observatory (HAO)
 National Institute of Standards and Technology (NIST)
 National Oceanic and Atmospheric Administration (NOAA)
 Earth System Research Laboratory (ESRL)
 Space Weather Prediction Center (SWPC)
 National Snow and Ice Data Center (NSIDC)
 National Solar Observatory (NSO)
 National Telecommunications and Information Administration(NTIA) – Institute for Telecommunication Sciences Boulder
 Renewable and Sustainable Energy Institute (RASEI)
 Rocky Mountain Institute
 Southwest Research Institute Department of Space Studies
 Space Science Institute
 UNAVCO National Science Foundation's Geodetic Facility
 United States Geological Survey (USGS)

Media

Boulder's main daily newspaper, the Daily Camera, was founded in 1890 as the weekly Boulder Camera, and became a daily newspaper the following year. The Colorado Daily was started in 1892 as a university newspaper for CU Boulder. Following many heated controversies over Colorado Daily political coverage, it severed its ties to the university in 1971. In summer 1996, the Boulder Planet, a free weekly competing with the Boulder Weekly, published its first issue; it ceased publication in February 2000. Newspaper conglomerate Scripps acquired the Colorado Daily in 2005 after its acquisition of the Camera in 1997, leaving the Boulder Weekly as the only locally owned newspaper in Boulder. Scripps relinquished its 50 percent ownership in both daily papers in early 2009 to Media News Group. Boulder Magazine, a lifestyle magazine, was founded in 1978. Boulder Magazine is published three times per year.

Boulder is part of the Denver market for television stations, and it also receives many radio stations based in Denver or Ft. Collins. For cable television, Boulder is served by Comcast Cable. The city operates public service Boulder 8 TV on cable (high- and standard-definition), which airs, live-streams and archives council meetings; with its in-house video production facilities, it also produces news, talk and informational programming. Over-the-air television reception is poor in the western part of the city because of interference from mountains.

Non-commercial community radio station KGNU was founded in 1978 and commercial music station KBCO in 1977. KBCO programs an adult album alternative format and is owned and operated by iHeartMedia. KBCO moved its studios from Boulder to the Denver Tech Center in 2010 but still maintains the Boulder license and transmits from atop Eldorado Mountain south of Boulder.

KVCU, also known as Radio 1190, is another non-commercial radio station run with the help of university-student volunteers. KVCU started broadcasting in 1998.

NPR programming is heard over KCFC 1490 AM, operated by Colorado Public Radio, and simulcasting Denver station KCFR 90.1.

KRKS-FM 94.7, owned and operated by Salem Media Group and affiliated with SRN News, offers a Christian talk and teaching format, and has its transmitter located on Lee Hill, northwest of Boulder.

The University of Colorado Press, a non-profit co-op of various western universities, publishes academic books. Paladin Press book/video publishers and Soldier of Fortune magazine both have their headquarters in Boulder. Paladin Press was founded in September 1970 by Peder Lund and Robert K. Brown. In 1974, Lund bought out Brown's share of the press, and Brown moved on to found Soldier of Fortune magazine the following year.

Infrastructure

Transportation

Since Boulder has operated under residential growth control ordinances since 1976, the growth of employment in the city has far outstripped population growth. Considerable road traffic enters the city each morning and leaves each afternoon, since many employees live in Longmont, Lafayette, Louisville, Broomfield, Westminster, and Denver. Boulder is served by US 36 and a variety of state highways. Parking regulations in Boulder have been explicitly designed to discourage parking by commuters and to encourage the use of mass transit, with mixed results.

Over the years, Boulder has made significant investments in the multi-modal network. The city is now well known for its grade-separated bicycle and pedestrian paths, which are integrated into a network of bicycle lanes, cycle tracks, and on-street bicycle routes. Boulder also provides a community transit network that connects downtown, the University of Colorado campuses, and local shopping amenities. While the city has no rail transit, local and regional shuttle busses are funded by a variety of sources. Due in part to these investments in pedestrian, bicycle, and transit infrastructure, Boulder has been recognized both nationally and internationally for its transportation system.

In 2009, the Boulder metropolitan statistical area (MSA) ranked as the fourth highest in the United States for percentage of commuters who biked to work (5.4 percent). In 2013, the Boulder MSA ranked as the fourth lowest in the United States for percentage of workers who commuted by private automobile (71.9 percent). During the same time period, 11.1 percent of Boulder area workers had no commute whatsoever: they worked out of the home.

Transit
Boulder has an extensive bus system operated by the Regional Transportation District (RTD). The HOP, SKIP, JUMP, Bound, DASH and Stampede routes run throughout the city and connect to nearby communities with departures every ten minutes during peak hours, Monday-Friday. Other routes, such as the 204, 205, 206, 208 and 209 depart every 15 to 30 minutes. Regional routes, traveling between nearby cities such as Longmont (BOLT, J), Golden (GS), and Denver (Flatiron Flyer, a bus rapid transit route), as well as Denver International Airport (AB), are also available. There are over 100 scheduled daily bus trips on seven routes that run between Boulder and Denver on weekdays.

Future transit plans
A 41-mile RTD commuter rail route called the Northwest Rail Line is proposed to run from Denver through Boulder to Longmont, with stops in major communities along the way. The Boulder station is to be north of Pearl Street and east of 30th Street. At one time this commuter rail service was scheduled to commence in 2014, but major delays have ensued. In 2016, an initial six-mile segment opened, reaching from downtown Denver to southern Westminster at West 71st Avenue and Federal Boulevard. The remaining 35 miles of the Northwest Rail Line is planned to be completed by 2044, depending upon funding.

These future transit plans, as well as the current Flatiron Flyer Bus Rapid Transit route, are part of FasTracks, an RTD transit improvement plan funded by a 0.4% increase in the sales tax throughout the Denver metro area. RTD, the developer of FasTracks, is partnering with the city of Boulder to plan a transit-oriented development near Pearl and 33rd Streets in association with the proposed Boulder commuter rail station. The development is to feature the Boulder Railroad Depot, already relocated to that site, which may be returned to a transit-related use.

Cycling
Boulder, well known for its bicycle culture, has hundreds of miles of bicycle-pedestrian paths, lanes, and routes that interconnect to create a renowned network of bikeways usable year-round. Boulder has 74 bike and pedestrian underpasses that facilitate safer and uninterrupted travel throughout much of the city. The city offers a route-finding website that allows users to map personalized bike routes around the city, and is one of five communities to have received a "Platinum Bicycle Friendly Community" rating from the League of American Bicyclists.

The headquarters of the free and non-obligatory hospitality exchange network for cyclists, Warm Showers, is based in Boulder.

In May 2011, B-cycle bike-sharing opened in Boulder with 100 red bikes and 12 stations.

Airport

Notable people

 Albert Allen Bartlett, emeritus professor of physics
 Jello Biafra, Dead Kennedys frontman
 Tony Boselli, five-time Pro Bowl offensive tackle
 Bill Bower, the last surviving pilot who took part in the Doolittle Raid
 Arleigh Burke, United States Navy Admiral and Chief of Naval Operations
 Scott Carpenter, Project Mercury astronaut
 Alonzo Clemons, sculptor and autistic savant
 Jack Collom, poet
 Kristin Davis, Sex and the City actress
 Joey "CoCo" Diaz was a resident of Boulder during the 1980s and 1990s
 John Fante, writer
 Justine Frischmann, British artist and former lead singer of Elastica
 Andrea Gibson, spoken word artist, poet, activist
 Allen Ginsberg, taught at Naropa University and lived much of his life in Boulder
 Michael Grab, a Canadian-born artist specializing in rock balancing and photography
 Matt Hasselbeck, three-time Pro Bowl quarterback
 Carrie Ingalls (Little House on the Prairie) lived in Boulder in 1905 – 1906
 Scott Jurek, ultramarathoner, writer and public speaker
 Hanna Kroeger, vendor of health food and alternative medicine products
 Eagle Wynne McMahon, professional disc golf player
 Kimbal Musk, American entrepreneur, philanthropist, and restaurateur
 Chief Niwot or Left Hand, a tribal leader of the Arapaho, lived at the site of Boulder.
 Shane O'Neil, soccer player for the Seattle Sounders FC
 Chuck Pagano, former Indianapolis Colts head coach
 Phil Plait, "The Bad Astronomer", astronomer, skeptic, writer and science blogger
 Jared Polis, Governor of Colorado
 JonBenét Ramsey, when she was murdered in December 1996.
 Larry Sellers, actor, had lived in the town
 Lidia Șimon, retired Romanian Olympic long-distance runner
 Evans Woollen III, architect

In popular culture

Woody Allen's film Sleeper (1973) was filmed on location in Boulder. Some houses and the Mesa Laboratory of the National Center for Atmospheric Research, designed by I. M. Pei, were used in the film.

Boulder was a setting for Stephen King's book The Stand (1978), as the gathering point for some of the survivors of the superflu. King lived in Boulder for a little less than a year, beginning in the autumn of 1974, and wrote The Shining (1977) during this period.

The television sitcom Mork & Mindy (1978–1982) was set in Boulder, with 1619 Pine St. serving as the exterior shot of Mindy's home. The New York Deli, a now closed restaurant in the Pearl Street Mall, was also featured prominently in the series.

In the American version of the television sitcom The Office, the character Michael Scott leaves the show in season 7 and moves with his fiancée to Boulder.

"Boulder to Birmingham" is a song written by Emmylou Harris and Bill Danoff which first appeared on Harris's 1975 album Pieces of the Sky. It has served as something of a signature tune for the artist and recounts her feelings of grief in the years following the death of country rock star and mentor Gram Parsons.

The Comedy Central television show Broad City ends with the protagonist, Abby, moving to Boulder for an art fellowship.

Sister cities
Boulder's sister cities are:

 Dushanbe, Tajikistan (1987)
 Jalapa, Nueva Segovia Department, Nicaragua (1983)
 Kathmandu, Nepal (2018)
 Kisumu, Kenya (2008)
 Lhasa, Tibet Autonomous Region, China (1986)
 El Mante, Tamaulipas,  Mexico (2000)
 Nablus, West Bank,  Palestine (2016)
 Ramat HaNegev, Southern District, Israel (2018)
 Yamagata, Yamagata,  Japan (1994)
 Yateras, Guantánamo Province, Cuba (2002)

Landmarks representing Boulder's connection with its various sister cities can be found throughout the city. Boulder's Sister City Plaza – dedicated on May 17, 2007 – is located on the east lawn of Boulder's Municipal Building. The plaza was built to honor all of Boulder's sister city relationships.

The Dushanbe Tea House is located on 13th Street just south of the Pearl Street Mall. Dushanbe presented its distinctive tea house as a gift to Boulder in 1987. It was completed in Tajikistan in 1990 and then shipped to Boulder, where it was reassembled and opened to the public in 1998.

A mural representing the relationship between Boulder and Mante, Mexico, was dedicated in August 2001. The mural, which was painted by Mante muralist Florian Lopez, is located on the north-facing wall of the Dairy Center for the Performing Arts.

See also

Colorado
Bibliography of Colorado
Index of Colorado-related articles
Outline of Colorado
List of counties in Colorado
List of municipalities in Colorado
List of places in Colorado
List of statistical areas in Colorado
Front Range Urban Corridor
North Central Colorado Urban Area
Denver-Aurora, CO Combined Statistical Area
Boulder, CO Metropolitan Statistical Area
2013 Colorado floods

References

Further reading

 Deloria, Philip J. "Drain the Lake! Tear Down the Butte! Build Paradise!: The Environmental Dimensions of Social and Economic Power in Boulder, Colorado, and Benzie, Michigan," Southern California Quarterly (2007): 65–88. in JSTOR
 Pettem, Silvia. Boulder: Evolution of a City (University Press of Colorado, 1994)

External links

 City of Boulder website
 CDOT map of the City of Boulder

 
Busking venues
Cities in Boulder County, Colorado
Cities in Colorado
County seats in Colorado
Populated places established in 1858